Srinisha Jayaseelan (born 26 September 1999) is an Indian playback singer. She participated in the reality show Super Singer Junior S2 in the year 2009 as a contestant, which was telecasted in Vijay Television. She made her debut as a playback singer in the movie Amma Kanakku under the music composition of Ilaiyaraaja in the year 2016. Srinisha was again reintroduced to the audience, after her participation in the reality show Super Singer Champion of Champions, which gained her popularity.

Early life 
Srinisha was born in Chennai, Tamil Nadu to Mr. Selvaraj Jayaseelan and Mrs. Sujatha Jayaseelan. She did her schooling in TST Rajah Girls Matriculation Higher Secondary School, Chennai and later completed her bachelor's degree in commerce at Ethiraj College for Women.

Career

Television 
Srinisha was introduced in Television through Super Singer Junior (season 2). She was eliminated from the competition as a semi-finalist. She later appeared as a guest performer and backing vocalist in subsequent seasons of the show, and competed in other Vijay TV music competitions. Srinisha was also a part of the team 'Chennai Rockstars' in the first season and team 'White Devils' in the second season of the Super Singer T20. 'White Devils' team was crowned the title winner of the competition after delivering outstanding performances during the finals and throughout the competition.

In the year 2020, she gained popularity through her performances when she participated in the reality show Super Singer Champion of Champions featuring the Super Singer Stars, where she performed along with her team 'Bachelor Band' that included playback singer Sam Vishal and DJ Sudhan aka DJ Black. According to sources, Bachelor Band was the first ever team to use a DJ in a musical show in the south. With this unique combo of musicians, they made their way into the finals as a direct finalist along with the Nighty Boys (Srinivasan Raghunathan, Diwakar and Manoj) and the Ooo Team''' (Maalavika Sundar, Santhosh Hariharan and Rangapriya).

 As playback singer 
Srinisha's debut as a playback singer was in the year 2016 when she sang the song 'Maths Tough' for Music Director Ilaiyaraaja in the movie Amma Kanakku. She had earlier sung a song for Music Director Yuvan Shankar Raja for the film Avan Ivan in the year 2014.Vilambara Idaiveli from Imaikkaa Nodigal, Kanna Veesi from Kadhal Ondru Kanden and Adi Penne'' from the Naam series are few of her notable works.

Discography

Film Songs

Non-film Songs

Other works

External links

References 

Indian musicians
Ethiraj College for Women alumni
21st-century Indian women singers
21st-century Indian singers
Living people
1999 births
Tamil musicians
Singers from Tamil Nadu
Tamil playback singers
Telugu playback singers
Indian women singers
Indian women playback singers
Musicians from Chennai